Edward Ashton Rollins (December 8, 1828 – September 7, 1885) was an American lawyer, banker, and politician that served as the 4th Commissioner of Internal Revenue from 1865 to 1869. Rollins also served as the Speaker of the New Hampshire House of Representatives from 1861 to 1862.

References

Commissioners of Internal Revenue
1828 births
1885 deaths
People from Hanover, New Hampshire
Members of the New Hampshire House of Representatives
19th-century American politicians